David Fletcher (born 1952) is a New Zealand cartoonist.

Fletcher was born in the UK but emigrated to New Zealand. He produced "The Politician", a daily cartoon strip that appears in The Dominion Post as well as various publications around the world. He was employed as an illustrator and cartoonist by New Zealand's largest daily newspaper the New Zealand Herald for three years, but for the last twenty years he has been working from home as a comic strip artist.

Apart from the "Politician" strip he also produces several weekly strips, "TV Kids" for the TV Guide and since 2007,
Crumb, a strip created especially for mobile phones published by ROK Comics, which centres on the antics of an ever-hungry blackbird.

“Comics for mobiles seems to me to be the future for cartoon strips and comics,” David said of Crumb after ROK Comics announced the strip would be published in Chinese in China in June 2008. “Readers can now choose which comics they want to read and not be told by an editor which comics they can read.

“I love the fact that the mobile cartoon strip is no longer restricted to the usual number of three or four panel, which allows the cartoonist far more freedom to express his idea. Comics for mobiles has come as a breath of fresh air for the comics industry.”

Fletcher's cartoons are syndicated to Europe, Britain, Africa, Malaysia, China, Pakistan, South Africa, Australia and New Zealand.

He lives in Auckland with his wife and two children, Madeleine and Patrick.

References

External links
 
 CloudTweaks - The Lighter Side Of The Cloud
 Crumb Crumb, Fletcher's strip about a food-obsessed blackbird
 Crumb Blog
 Crumb on Web Comic Nation
Search for work by David Fletcher on DigitalNZ

1952 births
Living people
New Zealand cartoonists